Justice Gleason may refer to:

Mary J. L. Gleason (fl. 1980s–2020s) justice of the Federal Court of Appeal of Canada
William E. Gleason (1830s–after 1880), justice of the Dakota Territorial Supreme Court